Pseudechiniscus is a species of tardigrade in the family Echiniscidae. The species is endemic to the island of São Tomé in São Tomé and Príncipe. The species was first described by Paulo Fontoura, Giovanni Pilato and Oscar Lisi in 2010.

Description
This tardigrade species measures between 119 and 168 µm

References

Echiniscidae
Endemic fauna of São Tomé Island
Invertebrates of São Tomé and Príncipe
Animals described in 2010
Taxa named by Paulo Fontoura
Taxa named by Giovanni Pilato
Taxa named by Oscar Lisi